Attheya decora is a species of diatoms in the genus Attheya. Type material was collected from Cresswell sands, Northumberland by Mr. Atthey.

References

External links
INA card
Link to picture of Attheya decora

Species described in 1860
Coscinodiscophyceae